Tiago Brendle (born ) is a Brazilian male volleyball player. He is part of the Brazil men's national volleyball team. On club level he plays for APAN Blumenau.

Awards

National team
 2005  FIVB U21 World Championship
 2015  Pan American Games
 2015  South American Championship
 2016  FIVB World League
 2017  FIVB World League
 2017  South American Championship
 2017  FIVB World Grand Champions Cup

Individual
 2015 Pan American Games – Best Libero
 2015 Pan American Games – Best Receiver
 2015 Pan American Games – Best Digger
 2017–18 Brazilian Superliga – Best Digger

References

External links
 profile at FIVB.org

1985 births
Living people
Brazilian men's volleyball players
Place of birth missing (living people)
Pan American Games medalists in volleyball
Universiade medalists in volleyball
Pan American Games silver medalists for Brazil
Volleyball players at the 2015 Pan American Games
Universiade silver medalists for Brazil
Medalists at the 2009 Summer Universiade
Medalists at the 2011 Summer Universiade
Medalists at the 2015 Pan American Games